Feuermusik was a Canadian experimental jazz duo based in Toronto, Ontario, active in the 2000s. Consisting of former Rockets Red Glare members Jeremy Strachan and Gus Weinkauf, the band's instrumentation consisted exclusively of saxophone and a set of amplified plastic and metal buckets for percussion.

History
Strachan and Weinkauf formed Feuermusik in 2004. The band's debut album, Goodbye Lucille, was released independently in 2006. It received substantial play on community and campus radio stations. The song "Doppelspiel" was later named as a shortlisted nominee for the 2007 Echo Songwriting Prize.

Their second album, No Contest, followed in 2008. They continued to perform in the Toronto area, sometimes with additional musicians. In 2009 the pair performed at Sappyfest in Sackville, and in 2010 they performed at the Halifax Pop Explosion festival.

References

External links
Feuermusik at CBC Music

Canadian jazz ensembles
Canadian experimental musical groups
Musical groups from Toronto
Musical groups established in 2004
Musical groups disestablished in 2010
Musical groups with year of establishment missing
2004 establishments in Ontario
2010 disestablishments in Ontario